Alan Raymond Howard (11 December 1909 – March 1993) was an English cricketer.  Howard was a left-handed batsman who bowled left-arm medium pace.  He was born at Leicester, Leicestershire.

Howard made his first-class debut for Glamorgan against Worcestershire at New Road, Worcester, in the 1927 County Championship.  A semi-regular in the Glamorgan side, he made 58 further first-class appearances for the county, the last of which came against Lancashire at Old Trafford in the 1933 County Championship. Howard's role within the Glamorgan team was as a batsman, in that role he scored 1,181 runs in his 59 first-class matches for the county, which came at an average of 12.13, with a high score of 63. One of three half centuries he made for Glamorgan, this score came against Derbyshire in 1930. He also made a single first-class appearance for Wales against the Marylebone Cricket Club in 1930 at Lord's. In a match which Wales lost by an innings and 44 runs, Howard made scores of 6 and 22.

He died in March 1993 at Hanworth, Middlesex. His father, Arthur, and brother, Jack, both played first-class cricket for Leicestershire.

References

External links
Alan Howard at ESPNcricinfo
Alan Howard at CricketArchive

1909 births
1993 deaths
Cricketers from Leicester
English cricketers
Glamorgan cricketers
Wales cricketers